Xylariomycetidae is a subclass of sac fungi.

Orders
As accepted by Wijayawardene et al. 2020;
 Amphisphaeriales (15 families)
 Amphisphaeriaceae (4)
 Apiosporaceae (4)
 Beltraniaceae (9)
 Castanediellaceae (1)
 Clypeophysalosporaceae (4)
 Hyponectriaceae (17)
 Iodosphaeriaceae (1)
 Melogrammataceae (1)
 Oxydothidaceae (1)
 Phlogicylindriaceae (3)
 Pseudomassariaceae (4)
 Pseudosporidesmiaceae (1)
 Pseudotruncatellaceae (1)
 Sporocadaceae (35)
 Vialaeaceae (1)

 Delonicicolales
 Delonicicolaceae (2 genera)
 Leptosilliaceae (1)

 Xylariales (ca 20 families)
 Anungitiomycetaceae (3)
 Barrmaeliaceae (2)
 Cainiaceae (10)
 Clypeosphaeriaceae (7)
 Coniocessiaceae (2)
 Diatrypaceae (22)
 Fasciatisporaceae (1)
 Graphostromataceae (5)
 Hansfordiaceae (1)
 Hypoxylaceae (18)
 Induratiaceae (2)
 Lopadostomataceae (4)
 Microdochiaceae (3)
 Polystigmataceae (1)
 Nothodactylariaceae (1)
 Requienellaceae (4)
 Vamsapriyaceae (1)
 Xyladictyochaetaceae (2)
 Xylariaceae (38)
 Zygosporiaceae (1)

References

Sordariomycetes
Fungus subclasses
fungus taxa
Taxa described in 1997